Khotang Bazar is a village and Village Development Committee  in Khotang District in Province No. 1 in eastern Nepal. At the time of the 1991 Nepal census, it had a population of 2,433 persons living in 458 individual households.....

References

External links
UN map of the municipalities of Khotang District

Populated places in Khotang District